Longbar is a hamlet in North Ayrshire, Scotland, immediately to the east of Glengarnock.

History
Longbar is now a housing estate situated on the low hillside above the Longbar Farm.  Originally it was a string of single-storey terraced cottages (rows) that ran from the farm east towards the junction of the Auchengree Road with the B777 road.  Both versions of the hamlet have provided housing for workers in the local heavy industries, primarily the Glengarnock Steel Works.

When the steel works closed in the early 1980s the inhabitants of the community found themselves largely unemployed and the housing estate became notorious for its social problems. Since then much of it has been purchased by its inhabitants.

The community shares a community hall with the neighbouring hamlet of Auchengree, or Meikle Auchengree.

See also

The Barony of Kersland
Meikle Auchengree

References

External links

 YouTube video - Kersland Glen
 YouTube video - Lower Kersland Glen and the mills

Villages in North Ayrshire
Hamlets in Scotland
Garnock Valley